The Sugoy is a river in Magadan Oblast, Russian Far East.

The river freezes in October and stays frozen until late May or early June. There are important coal deposits in the Sugoy basin.

Course 
After a sharp bend it flows northwards along the eastern flank of the Omsukchan Range. Finally it joins the right bank of the Kolyma  from its mouth.

The main tributary of the Sugoy is the Khetagchan (Хетагчан) that joins it in its lower course from the right.

See also
List of rivers of Russia

References

External links
Water (in Russian)
Kolyma - Modern Guidebook to Magadan Oblast
Rivers of Magadan Oblast
Kolyma Mountains